was a daimyō in Japan during the Edo period (1603–1868). Mitsusada born as son and heir of Tokugawa Yorinobu and a grandson of Tokugawa Ieyasu with childhood name Nagatomimaru (長福丸). Among his sons was the eighth Tokugawa shōgun Yoshimune. Norihime, daughter of his married Ichijō Kaneteru. He married daughter of Prince Fushimi-no-Miya Sadakiyo, Yaso-no-Miya Teruko (who also sister of Asa no Miya Akiko who was 4th shōgun, Tokugawa Ietsuna's wife).

One of the gosanke, Mitsusada ruled the Wakayama Domain from its castle, his birthplace, in Wakayama. He reached the Junior Second court rank while alive, and was awarded the Junior First rank posthumously; he also held the ceremonial post of gon-dainagon. His grave is at Chōhō-ji in Wakayama. His another sons was Tokugawa Tsunanori (1665-1705) and Tokugawa Yoritomo (1680-1705).

Family
 Father: Tokugawa Yorinobu
 Mother: Nakagawa-dono (1601-1666)
 Wife: Yaso-no-Miya Teruko later Tenshin'in
 Concubines
 Yamada-dono later Zuiyoin
 Miyazaki-dono
 Chigusa-dono
 Oyuri no Kata (1655-1726)
 Children:
 Tokugawa Tsunanori (1665-1705) by Yamada, 4th Lord of Kishu and married Tsuruhime, daughter of 5th shōgun Tokugawa Tsunayoshi
 Jirokichi
 Tokugawa Yorimoto (1680-1705) by Miyazaki, 5th Lord of Kishu
 Tokugawa Yoshimune by Oyuri
 Sakae-Hime married Uesugi Tsunanori of Yonezawa Domain
 Norihime married Ichijo Kaneteru
 Tsunahime by Chigusa
 Ikuhime married Satake Yoshimitsu

Ancestry

See also
Chōhō-ji

Sources
「徳川光貞」 at the Japanese Wikipedia

References

1627 births
1705 deaths
Kishū-Tokugawa clan
Shinpan daimyo
People from Wakayama (city)